William Langson Lathrop (pronounced "LAY-throp") (March 29, 1859 – September 21, 1938) was an American Impressionist landscape painter and founder of the art colony at New Hope, Pennsylvania. He is sometimes referred to as a "Pennsylvania Impressionist". Lathrop was a member of the National Academy of Design and served on numerous exhibition juries during his career. He received a gold medal at the Panama–Pacific International Exposition (1915) in San Francisco, California, which showcased works by many of the major American artists of the time. 

Today, Lathrop's paintings are in numerous museum collections including the Metropolitan Museum of Art in New York City, and the Smithsonian American Art Museum in Washington, D.C.

Early life 
Lathrop was born in Painesville, Ohio and grew up on his family's farm. He spent his childhood along the shores of Lake Erie where he learned to sail.

Career 
Lathrop began his art career in New York City in the late 1870s as an illustrator and part-time etcher, both pursuits that earned him little money. After traveling to Europe in the 1880s, Lathrop returned to the United States where he endured financial difficulty and briefly turned away from art before friends convinced him to enter his watercolors in a prestigious New York show. Lathrop received the top prize and a glowing review in The New York Times, and his career was launched.

In 1899 Lathrop moved to New Hope, on the Delaware Canal, alongside the Delaware River, just north of the village New Hope, Pennsylvania along with other artists studying outdoor landscape painting with him (en plein air). Lathrop would take his students on the Delaware Canal on his barge which he called "Sunshine," which gave the students an opportunity to sketch the passing landscape. As with William Merritt Chase's classes in the Shinnecock Hills of Long Island, or like Birge Harrison's landscape classes for the Art Students League in Woodstock, New York, Lathrop's outdoor landscape painting classes laid the seeds for the development of an American art colony.

For more than thirty years Lathrop pursued landscape painting at New Hope, exhibiting his works in galleries across the nation. During this time Lathrop's painting style evolved from tonalist, characterized by darker colors and an emphasis on mood, to the brighter impressionist paintings for which he is best remembered today.

In 1916, six local artists formed "The New Hope Group," including Lathrop, Charles Rosen, Daniel Garber, Morgan Colt, Rae Sloan Bredin and Robert Spencer. All lived in close proximity to each other, near the Delaware River. Noticebly absent was the local artist with the biggest reputation, Edward Redfield. The significance of this group lies in the fact that they exhibited their work together and were representative of one school of landscape painting. The New hope Group only exhibited in 1916 and 1917, but with the exception of Redfield, they formed the early core of this school, They exhibited at the Cincinnati Art Museum, the Detroit Art Institute, the Corcoran Gallery, the Carnegie Institute and at the Arlington Gallery in New York City, among other places.

Lathrop was instrumental in the founding of Phillips Mill, an 18th-century stone mill, as the leading exhibition place for the New Hope Art Colony. The mill was located opposite Lathrop's home on River Road, north of New Hope. In October 1928, local artist William Taylor was appointed to head a subscription committee for the purchase of the mill as a community center. The mill was purchased for $5,000.00, and Lathrop became the mill's first president.

Personal life 
In the late 1880s Lathrop traveled to Europe where he met and married his wife, Annie. Their children included Julian W. Lanthrop, Joseoph Lanthrop, and Mrs. Rols Bauhan. In 1899 Lathrop and his family moved to New Hope, on the Delaware Canal, alongside the Delaware River, just north of the village New Hope, Pennsylvania. After they moved to River Road, north of New Hope at Phillips Mill, Pennsylvanai, his wife Annie became a hostess to ever-increasing numbers of visitors at her Sunday afternoon teas. Guests included Lathrop's students—such as Margaret Fulton Spencer—and other artists who eventually moved to the area. Charles Rosen, Robert Spencer, Rae Sloan Bredin, Mary Elzabeth Price and John Folinsbee (all who lived nearby), were frequent visitors until the teas shifted across the road the Philips Mill..

In the late 1920s, Lathrop hand-built a wooden boat in his backyard and named it The Widge. Measuring over twenty feet in length, Lathrop and his friends launched The Widge into the Delaware River in 1930. Lathrop, an able sailor, piloted the boat into the Atlantic coastal waters. He continued sailing for pleasure in his later years, painting scenes of the Atlantic shoreline and even once entertaining Albert Einstein on board as a guest.

On September 21, 1938, Lathrop was piloting his boat around eastern Mountauk Point, Long Island when word came of an approaching hurricane. Far from safe harbor, Lathrop chose to ride out the storm in a sheltered bay. While The Widge survived the storm, Lathrop's body was recovered along the shoreline a month later. Eyewitness accounts of Lathrop from occupants of nearby boats indicated he may have died of a heart attack during the storm, and been blown or washed from his boat. However, his last painting survived the hurricane. Although the famed 1938 hurricane proved to be a tragic as well as dramatic ending for Lathrop, it did seem an appropriate ending for an artist who had spent his life recording both the darker and lighter moods of nature!

Further reading

References

External links

1859 births
1938 deaths
19th-century American painters
19th-century American male artists
American male painters
20th-century American painters
American Impressionist painters
People from Painesville, Ohio
People from New Hope, Pennsylvania
Pennsylvania Impressionism
20th-century American male artists